Bill Andrews (born 1966) is an American drummer. He is best known for his work with Death and Massacre. He lives in Japan.

Discography
 Death - Leprosy (1988)
 Death - Spiritual Healing (1990)
 Massacre - From Beyond (1991)
 Massacre - Inhuman Condition EP (1992)

References

Death (metal band) members
American heavy metal drummers
Living people
1966 births
20th-century American drummers
American male drummers
Massacre (metal band) members
20th-century American male musicians